Udayan Higher Secondary School Dhaka, formerly known as Udayan Bidyalaya is a private higher secondary school in Bangladesh, established in 1955 by the University of Dhaka. It is a co-educational institution.

The school was first allotted a small piece of land and two sheds. With the increase in the number of students it was upgraded to a secondary school and, after independence of Bangladesh, as a higher secondary one. In 1976, it received formal recognition from the Dhaka Board of Intermediate and Secondary Education.

In 1980, it applied for a larger space and Dhaka University donated an area of  not far from its original location on Fuller Road. Construction of the new five-storied building was completed in 1987. Although established with donations from University of Dhaka, the school enjoys the status of a private organisation.

The school conducts co-education programmes and in 1999, had 60 teachers (44 women), 14 other staff, and 2,030 students of whom 935 were girls. It is equipped with computer labs, science labs and library. It takes part in scout and girls guide activities and in serving distressed people in situations of flood or other natural calamity. The school boasts of a band group of its own and performs in sports, cultural shows, science fairs and debating competitions. In 1998, it introduced intermediate level programmes with courses in business studies and science, and was upgraded to a school cum college, and took its name as Udayan Higher Secondary School.

History 

Udayan Bidyalaya started in June 1955..  At that time it was not called "Udayan Bidyalaya," instead it was known as "Dhaka English Preparatory School." From 1955 until 1992, it was located on the land next to the Vice-Chancellor's house of Dhaka University.

The Dhaka English Preparatory school started functioning when menials quarters attached to the residence of the vice-chancellor were renovated. After additions and alterations, the school started functioning.  The land and the renovated semi-constructed building were leased out to the school on a nominal rent of taka ten per month.

The syndicate of Dhaka University in a meeting held on 31 May 1969 granted permission to the school to construct another story on the school building. The university gave permission to change the name of Dhaka English Preparatory school as Udayan Bidyalaya and also to its upgrading as a high school.

The Government of Bangladesh, on 31 October 1980, approved the managing committee for the Bidyalaya under rule 20(2) of the Managing Committee Regulations of 1977. The Dhaka Education Board installed the first such committee by an official order in November 1980 and the second such committee on 25 January 1984.

On 14 March 1986, the foundation of the five-storied new building was inaugurated by the former Vice-Chancellor of Dhaka University, Prof. Abdul Mannan Choudhury. In 1991, the school received the award of the best school in the country. On 13 November 1991, the students had their first class day in the new building. However, in 1992, the school physically moved to its new five storied building located at 3/3 Fullar Road near Salimullah Muslim Hall of Dhaka University.

In 1997 the school opened its Higher Secondary Program and renamed as Udayan Higher Secondary School.

Campus 
Udayan is located at an alluring site in the Dhaka University Campus. It is situated right at the opposite of Salimullah Muslim Hall and the Dhaka office of British Council.

Initially situated on the land next to the Vice-Chancellor's house, the school got its current building completed in 1987.  

The school has a bit small campus with an area of 30,000 square feet. There is a 6 storied building bearing an aesthetic red brick architecture.

The administrative and the principal's offices are situated on the first floor while there are separate rooms for separate subject teachers e.g. all the math teachers share a specific math room which is located in the 6th floor. The labs for physics and biology and chemistry are all situated on the newly made 6th floor and the computer lab is situated on the 4th floor. The library is on the 3rd floor. There is a multimedia lab on the second floor especially to hold the public speaking classes.

School uniform 
Wearing the school uniform is compulsory for all the students from KG to 12th grade. The uniform for boys includes a white shirt and a navy blue trouser. The School monogram should be attached on the left side pocket on the shirt. The uniform also includes a necktie for boys but not compulsory to wear.

The girls' uniform includes a white shirt (with the monogram) and a navy blue skirt for up to 4th grade. From fifth grade the girls have to wear a white kamiz with navy blue orna and a navy blue trouser. The monogram should be attached on the left sleeve of the kamiz.

The students of grades 11th and 12th are required to have two navy blue stripes on the left sleeve of the shirt/kameez. The boys have to wear black Oxford shoes with black socks. The girls are to wear black ladies shoe having low heels with white socks. The prefects are given a captain badge which they have to wear during the school hours. Students are also required to wear the identity card given by the school authority.

Curriculum 
Udayan follows the standard curriculum provided by the National Curriculum and Textbook Board. Accordingly, the school provides education for primary, secondary and higher secondary levels. Along with the subjects of national curriculum, the students of KG to 8th grade are required to take part in drawing and physical education classes. There is also a weekly public speaking class for them taken in a multimedia classroom to make them fluent in English speaking and better their speech skills.

Students of secondary (9th–10th grade) and higher secondary (11th–12th grade) levels are allowed to choose a group between Science and Business studies.

Following the curriculum, Udayan prepares its students for PSC (5th grade), JSC (8th grade), SSC (10th grade) and HSC (12th grade) board examinations.

Classes are held five days a week having holidays on Friday and Saturday. After the morning assembly for 10 minutes, the classes begin at 8:10 am and end at 2 pm during the summer schedule (8:30 am–2:20 pm during the winter schedule). Students are not allowed to enter the school after 7:50 am. The school hours are split into eight periods consisting 40 minutes each. There is a recess of 30 minutes after the fifth period at 11:30 am.

Academic year 

Generally, the academic session of Udayan Higher Secondary School starts from the first week of January. For the students of KG to grade 10, the academic year includes two major semester exams, known as the 'Half yearly examination' and the 'Annual examination'. Students have to appear in all the subjects that are included in their curriculum in those examinations. The academic year for the students of higher secondary level starts from July.

The 'Half yearly examination'is normally taken on the months of June and July and the 'Annual examination'is generally taken on the month of November. Before these exams a class test on each subject is held during the normal classes.

Students enjoy almost month long breaks as the summer and winter vacations which usually happens in June and December. There is also a major vacation during the occasion of Eid-ul-Fitr. Apart from this, the school remains closed in the bank holidays.

Extra-curricular activities 
As an exemplary educational institution, Udayan puts deep emphasise on the extra-curricular activities that would ensure the betterment of mental as well as physical aptitude of its students.

The school publishes an annual magazine comprising English and Bengali articles, poems, fictions etc. written by the students and teachers. There is also a quarterly published by the school called "Udayan Bulletin".

There is a debate club which has represented the school in various inter-school debate competitions and brought enormous recognition to the school.

The school possesses passionate cricket and football teams which actively participate in the inter-school championships.

Students also take part in the physics and math Olympiads and bring rapturous honours to the school.

Udayan takes part in scout and girls guide activities and in serving distressed people in situations of flood or other natural calamity. The scout team has participated in many national and international scout jamborees.
Some active clubs:

 Anime Club
 Quiz Club
 Debate Club
 English Language Club
 Art Club
 Photography Club
 Science Club
 Sports Club
 cultural club
 Business club
 Movie Club

Traditions 

Udayan holds an annual prayer in January, praying for a prosperous and successful year for the school and its students. An Essay competition is also held on that day.

The annual sports day is held in the first week of February at the Dhaka University ground. The sports day includes various events of athletics. There is also a science fair day, generally held in May, where students from every grade display their scientific projects.

A farewell ceremony is also held for the students of 10th and 12th grades at the end of their academic sessions. The students also observe a class party on their last class of a year.

School picnics and exchange of delegations 
To bring a change in the monotonous academic calendar, Udayan arranges school picnics for the students annually. The students are taken to various amusement or picnic spots outside the city to have a day of immense pleasure.

With the assistance of British council, Udayan sends its delegations as well as receives representatives from British schools to share its teaching experience.

Alumni 
Udayan has an ebullient alumni which regularly holds re-union gatherings for the ex-students. In 2006, it organised a grand jubilation at the Bangabandhu International Conference Center, commemorating the 50th anniversary of the school's inception. The alumni is known as the "Ex-Udayan Students' Friendship Society (EUSFS)".

Gallery

References

External links
 Official website

Schools in Dhaka District
Educational institutions established in 1955
1955 establishments in East Pakistan